Charley R. Lockhart (August 1876 - 1954) was Texas State Treasurer from 1931 - 1941. He was the shortest Texas elected official at 3'9" (114 cm) tall.

Early life
Lockhart born in Dallas County, Texas in August 1876 to John C. R. and Lucretia Lockhart.  They moved to Snyder, Texas in 1898.

Career
Lockhart was elected Scurry County treasurer in 1900. He was re-elected to the county office eight times. In 1919 he went to Austin to work with the sergeant-at-arms of the Texas House of Representatives.

In 1930 he was elected state treasurer. In 1931, Ripley's Believe It Or Not featured a drawing of Lockhart under the caption "Texas, the largest state in the Union, has the smallest treasurer, Charley Lockhart, 45 inches tall." The Houston Post interviewed Lockhart when he entered the race for the state treasurer's office, and he is quoted as saying, "I want you to make it perfectly clear that I am fighting this battle on manhood alone," he said. "I don't want the votes that are given me through a feeling that life has not handed me a square deal. Life has been good to me. I have filled public office, earned the confidence and friendship of my fellows and educated my children. . . . I'm simply a little man with big ideas and sufficient experience and ability to carry my ideas out..."

He resigned his office on October 24, 1941, and was replaced by his hand-picked Deputy Jesse James.

Death and interment
Lockhart died in 1954 and was buried in the Snyder Cemetery.

Other media
 A newsreel showing the swearing-in of Lockhart is available

References

External links 
 

1876 births
1954 deaths
American politicians with disabilities
State treasurers of Texas
Texas Democrats
People with dwarfism
People from Dallas County, Texas
People from Snyder, Texas